Episactidae is a family of grasshoppers in the order Orthoptera. There are about 19 genera and more than 60 described species in Episactidae, found in Central and South America, China, and Madagascar.

Genera
These 19 genera belong to the family Episactidae:

 Acronomastax Descamps, 1965
 Antillacris Rehn & Rehn, 1939
 Episactus Burr, 1899
 Espagnola Rehn & Rehn, 1939
 Espagnoleta Perez-Gelabert, 2000
 Espagnolopsis Perez-Gelabert, Hierro & Otte, 1997
 Gymnotettix Bruner, 1901
 Heteromastax Descamps, 1965
 Lethus Rehn & Rehn, 1934
 Malagassa Saussure, 1903
 Neibamastax Rowell & Perez-Gelabert, 2006
 Paralethus Rowell & Perez-Gelabert, 2006
 Pielomastax Chang, 1937
 Rhabdomastax Descamps, 1969
 Seyrigella Chopard, 1951
 Tainacris Perez-Gelabert, Hierro, Dominici & Otte, 1997
 Teicophrys Bruner, 1901
 † Miraculum Bolívar, 1903
 † Paleomastacris Perez-Gelabert, Hierro, Dominici & Otte, 1997

References

Further reading

 
 

Caelifera